Dream art is any form of art that is directly based on a material from one's dreams, or a material that resembles dreams, but not directly based on them.

History
The first known reference to dream art was in the 12th century, when Charles Cooper Brown found a new way to look at art. However, dreams as art, without a "real" frame story, appear to be a later development—though there is no way to know whether many premodern works were dream-based.

In European literature, the Romantic movement emphasized the value of emotion and irrational inspiration. "Visions", whether from dreams or intoxication, served as raw material and were taken to represent the artist's highest creative potential.

In the late 19th and early 20th centuries, Symbolism and Expressionism introduced dream imagery into visual art. Expressionism was also a literary movement, and included the later work of the playwright August Strindberg, who coined the term "dream play" for a style of narrative that did not distinguish between fantasy and reality.

At the same time, discussion of dreams reached a new level of public awareness in the Western world due to the work of Sigmund Freud, who introduced the notion of the subconscious mind as a field of scientific inquiry. Freud greatly influenced the 20th-century Surrealists, who combined the visionary impulses of Romantics and Expressionists with a focus on the unconscious as a creative tool, and an assumption that apparently irrational content could contain significant meaning, perhaps more so than rational content.

The invention of film and animation brought new possibilities for vivid depiction of nonrealistic events, but films consisting entirely of dream imagery have remained an avant-garde rarity. Comic books and comic strips have explored dreams somewhat more often, starting with Winsor McCay's popular newspaper strips; the trend toward confessional works in alternative comics of the 1980s saw a proliferation of artists drawing their own dreams.

In the collection, The Committee of Sleep, Harvard psychologist Deirdre Barrett identifies modern dream-inspired art such as paintings including Jasper Johns's Flag, much of the work of Jim Dine and Salvador Dalí, novels ranging from "Sophie's Choice" to works by Anne Rice and Stephen King and films including Robert Altman's Three Women, John Sayles Brother from Another Planet and Ingmar Bergman's Wild Strawberries. That book also describes how Paul McCartney's Yesterday was heard by him in a dream and Most of Billy Joel's and Ladysmith Black Mambazo's music has originated in dreams.

Dream material continues to be used by a wide range of contemporary artists for various purposes. This practice is considered by some to be of psychological value for the artist—independent of the artistic value of the results—as part of the discipline of "dream work".

The international Association for the Study of Dreams holds an annual juried show of visual dream art.

Notable works directly based on dreams

Visual art
 Many works by William Blake (1757–1827)
 Many works by Salvador Dalí (1904–1989)
 Many works by Man Ray
 Many works by Max Magnus Norman
 Many works by Odilon Redon (1840–1916)
 Many works by Jonathan Borofsky (born 1942)
 Many works by Jim Shaw (born 1952)

Literature
 The Dream of Rhonabwy (14th century) Welsh prose tale
 The Dream of Macsen Wledig (14th century) Welsh prose tale 
 Kubla Khan (1816) by Samuel Taylor Coleridge (possibly based on a dream provoked by opium)
 Frankenstein (1818) by Mary Shelley
 The Strange Case of Dr. Jekyll and Mr. Hyde (1886) by Robert Louis Stevenson
  Dracula Bram Stoker claimed was inspired by a nightmare he had experienced
  Ten Nights' Dreams (1908) by Natsume Soseki
 The Dream-Quest of Unknown Kadath (1927) and other works by H.P. Lovecraft
 The Kin of Ata Are Waiting for You (1971) by Dorothy Bryant
 Most of Clive Barker's work
 The Art of Dreaming (1993)  Carlos Castaneda
 The Facts of Winter (2005) by Paul LaFarge

Film

 Several films of Andrei Tarkovsky, most notably The Mirror
 The major films of Sergei Parajanov, most notably Sayat Nova and Shadows of Forgotten Ancestors
 Much of the filmography of David Lynch (e.g. Eraserhead, Blue Velvet, Mulholland Drive, etc.)
 The Brother from Another Planet by John Sayles
 Dreams (1990) by Akira Kurosawa
 Many works of Federico Fellini (1920–1993)
 The works of Luis Buñuel
 Meshes of the Afternoon (1943), At Land (1944), and Ritual in Transfigured Time (1946) by Maya Deren.
 3 Women (1977) by Robert Altman
 Eyes Wide Shut (1999) by Stanley Kubrick
 Waking Life (2001) by Richard Linklater
 Destino (2003), an animated short film by Dominique Monféry
 Eternal Sunshine of the Spotless Mind (2004) and Science of Sleep (2006) by Michel Gondry
 Paprika (2006) by Satoshi Kon
 Dream (2008) by Kim Ki-duk
 Inception (2010) directed by Christopher Nolan
 Lucid Dream (2017) by Kim Joon-sung
 Napping Princess by Kenji Kamiyama (2017)
 118 (2019) by K. V. Guhan
 Malignant (2021) by James Wan
 Last Night in Soho (2021) by Edgar Wright
 Slumberland (2022) by Francis Lawrence

Comics
 Many short works of Julie Doucet
 Many short works of David B.
 Jim by Jim Woodring
 Psychonaut by Aleksandar Zograf
 Rare Bit Fiends by Rick Veitch
 Slow Wave by Jesse Reklaw

Music
 Devil's Trill Sonata by Giuseppe Tartini
 Réverie by Claude Debussy
 La Villa Strangiato by Rush
 Selected Ambient Works Volume II by Aphex Twin
 Yesterday by Paul McCartney
 El Cielo by Dredg
 Inside a Dream by Jane Wiedlin
 Isn't Anything and Loveless by My Bloody Valentine
 And the Glass-Handed Kites and other works of Mew
 If I Needed You by Townes Van Zandt
 The Pros and Cons of Hitch Hiking by Roger Waters
 Lucid Dreams by Celia Green
 Micro Cuts by Muse
 My Fruit Psychobells...A Seed Combustible, Bath,  Leaving Your Body Map, and Part the Second by maudlin of the Well
 Dimethyltryptamine by Jay Electronica 
 Until the Quiet Comes by Flying Lotus
 Dreaming by Blondie

Video GamesYume Nikki by KikiyamaOmori by OmocatLSD: Dream Emulator by Asmik Ace Entertainment

Works intended to resemble dreams, but not directly based on them

Novels
 Alice's Adventures in Wonderland by Lewis Carroll (1865)
 The Nightmare has Triplets trilogy by James Branch Cabell
 Smirt: An Urbane Nightmare (1934)
 Smith: A Sylvan Interlude (1934)
 Smire: An Acceptance in the Third Person (1937)
 The Coma by Alex Garland
 "Darkness at Noon" by Arther Koestler
 Most of the works of Franz Kafka
 Finnegans Wake by James Joyce
 Wake Trilogy by Lisa McMann
 WAKE (2008)
 FADE (2009)
 GONE (2010)

Drama
 A Dream Play (1901) and other plays by August Strindberg during his Symbolist and Expressionist periods
 Copacabana by Barry Manilow (born 1947)

Film
 Un chien andalou (1927) by Luis Buñuel and Salvador Dalí (actually started when Buñuel and Dalí discussed their dreams, then decided to start with two of them and make a film)
 Many films by Maya Deren (1917–1961)
 Many films by David Lynch, especially Eraserhead and Mulholland Drive, contain dreamlike elements.
 Dream scenes are popular in many horror movies, notably the Nightmare on Elm Street series
 The Trial by Orson Welles (based on the novel by Franz Kafka)
 Eternal Sunshine of the Spotless Mind features around witnessing the effects of having one's memory erased through dreaming.
 The Science of Sleep (2006) by Michel Gondry
 The Cell (2000) by Tarsem Singh contains vivid and surreal imagery to convey the mind-world of a serial killer.
 The Good Night (2007) by Jake Paltrow
 The animated science fiction film Paprika (2006) by Satoshi Kon features intense dream imagery.
 Inception (2010) by Christopher Nolan contains extravagant sequences inside the dreams of people through "dream sharing". There are many sequences in 'reality' that also feature very dream-like imagery, questioning the main protagonist's state of consciousness.

Comics
 Dreams of a Rarebit Fiend (1904–1921) and Little Nemo (1905–1913) by Winsor McCay (also his animated films)
 The Sandman (DC Comics/Vertigo) by Neil Gaiman
 Many works of Milo Manara
 Dream Company, a webcomic by Moon Ji-Hyeon

See also
 Dream world (plot device)
Video games about dreams Video games about dreams
 Magic realism
 Fantastic art
 Dream pop
 Shoegaze
 Psychedelic art
 Dream diary
 Dream interpretation

References

Further reading
 Reisman, David. Foreign Objects: Dream Drawings. New York: Hornbill Press, 2004.

External links
 Dreams: Artwork of the Collective Unconscious  (1998) by Gail Bixler-Thomas
 Fuzzy Dreamz'' (1996) by Dr. Hugo Heyrman —an online art project of short films, forming a psychogeography of dreams.

Visual arts genres
Art
Magic realism